Le Rœulx is a city and municipality of Wallonia located in the province of Hainaut, Belgium.

On January 1, 2006, Le Rœulx had a total population of 7,977. The total area is 42.80 km2 which gives a population density of 186 inhabitants per km2.

The municipality consists of the following districts: Gottignies, Le Rœulx, Mignault, Thieu, and Ville-sur-Haine.

The Château du Rœulx, a family seat of the Comtes de Croÿ-Rœulx, is situated near the town.

References

External links
 

Cities in Wallonia
Municipalities of Hainaut (province)